Vlastějovice is a municipality and village in Kutná Hora District in the Central Bohemian Region of the Czech Republic. It has about 500 inhabitants.

Administrative parts
Villages and hamlets of Březina, Budčice, Kounice, Milošovice, Pavlovice, Skala and Volavá Lhota are administrative parts of Vlastějovice.

References

Villages in Kutná Hora District